The Garcon Point Bridge is a 2-lane toll bridge in Santa Rosa County, in the Florida panhandle. The bridge generally runs north - south and connects U.S. Route 98 east of Gulf Breeze, Florida to Interstate 10 and U.S. Route 90 west of Milton, Florida. The road and bridge uses the TOLL 281 shield on signage from US 98 to I-10. North of I-10 the road is signed solely as State Road 281. Exit signs on I-10 display both the State Road 281 and TOLL 281 shields. The bridge crosses East Bay, a large section of Pensacola Bay and serves as an evacuation route during hurricanes.

History 
Due to the reputation of being a pet project of former Florida House Speaker Bolley "Bo" Johnson, D-Milton, who later went to federal prison for tax evasion, the bridge project was nicknamed "Bo's Bridge". It was completed in 1999 and in 2000, the Santa Rosa Bay Bridge Authority asked for an $500,000 loan from the state despite having to delay paying back previous multimillion-dollar loans from the state.  The loan was later denied in 2001.

In 1996, URS Greiner Woodward Clyde, a consulting firm, made traffic volume projections based on the assumption that the Garcon Point Bridge would have traffic similar to a nearby bridge to Destin, a popular beach resort instead of the subdivisions that it actually connects. In 2000, the average daily traffic was only 3500 vehicles a day, far from the 7500 that URS projected. In 2000, Arthur Goldberg, the URS vice president who wrote the estimates for the Garcon Point Bridge, told the St. Petersburg Times, "We now know that [we were wrong about the estimates]. I don't think the Garcon Point Bridge will ever get back to the forecast we made for it in 1996."

Odebrecht-Metric, the construction company who built the bridge, illegally dumped construction waste during the project, resulting in a $4 million fine for the company for violating the federal Clean Water Act. Three supervisors pleaded guilty and paid $1,000 in fines and served a probation.

Toll 

There is one toll plaza at the north end of the bridge. Tolls may be paid with cash or with the SunPass electronic toll system. From December 2019 to June 15, 2022, the one-way cost for the toll for a 2-axle vehicle was $5.00. SunPass users who cross the bridge 30 times per month receive a discount for the toll cost.

In November, 2014, the trustees of the bridge project proposed raising the bridge toll to $5 each way and reducing the discount given to frequent users.

On December 4, 2019, a State judge ruled that the bridge bond holders, UMB Bank, could increase the toll from the current rate of $3.75 per vehicle to $5 per vehicle.

On September 17, 2020, Governor Ron DeSantis has suspended tolls on the Garcon Point Bridge, as it is the primary alternate route for the Hurricane Sally-damaged Pensacola Bay Bridge. The repairs to that bridge were complete enough to allow traffic to return to the bridge on May 28, 2021. It later returned to having four lanes of traffic.

In June 2022, FDOT bought the bridge. The tolls were lowered to $2.30 for SunPass customers and $2.75 for cash users on June 16, 2022.

See also 
 Garcon Point, Florida

References

External links 
Santa Rosa Bay Bridge Authority
Florida @ SouthEastRoads - State Road 399
Garcon Point Bridge Site

Toll bridges in Florida
Bridges completed in 1999
Road bridges in Florida
Concrete bridges in the United States
Box girder bridges in the United States
Transportation buildings and structures in Santa Rosa County, Florida
1999 establishments in Florida